S.V. Saravanan (also known as SVS) is an Indian Politician from Gobichettipalayam constituency from Tamil Nadu Congress Committee, (Indian National Congress) party.

He has been chosen as candidate  for 2016 State Assembly Election by Tamil Nadu Congress Chief E. V. K. S. Elangovan and Indian National Congress President Rahul Gandhi.

Education
Saravanan holds a Diploma in Mechanical Engineering (D.M.E.).

Political career
He believes in Gandhian thoughts and Principles(Gandhism), he was ardent devotee of Karmaveerar Kamarajar(K. Kamaraj) and serving for Indian National Congress whose president was K. Kamaraj. He lives simple life. Because of his simplicity, he is also referred as 'namma ooru kamarajar (நம்ம ஊரு காமராஜர்)'  by his friends and people around him.

Elected by Publics
He has been elected for various posts by publics are.

Saravanan held District Panchayat Chairman post for Erode North (District Counselor, Gobichettipalayam Assembly) for the period 2006 to 2011.

He held Panchayat Union Counselor, Gobichettipalayam Assembly from year 2001 to 2006.

Saravanan held post Panchayat Union Chairman, Nambiyur Union, Gobichettipalayam Assembly, Erode District  from 1996 to 2001.

Public posts
Various public posts held by S. V. Saravanan are
 Library Association President, Diamond Jubilee Higher Secondary School, Gobichettipalayam in 1980.
 Chairman, Sakthi Polytechnic College, Sakthi Nagar, Gobichettipalayam in 1982
 PCC Member, Tamil Nadu Congress Committee, from 2001 to 2011

Family and personal life
Saravanan born in 1964 to Venkatachalam and Lakshmi. He is from an agricultural family from Sokkumaripalayam village, near Gobichettipalayam. It was a remote village. Even though S.V.Saravanan hailed from a remote village, he attained this position with his hard work and dedication, and with the only aim to serve people. On this journey, he had lost a lot.

He is humble person who prefers simple life. He is easily accessible by any person, any time, either by phone or in person or in any other means. He attends each and every functions, occasion or near and dears; and lives with everyone every day. Almost every youngsters in his constituency likes him as the way he is knowledgeable and respects youths.
 
Saravanan's grandfather K.R. Raju Gounder held post president, Nambiyur. S. V. Saravanan was a true follower of Gandhian thoughts and principles. He was ardent devotee of Karmaveerar Kamarajar. He was inspired by the simplicity and sincerity of Kamarajar and Gandhiji, Saravanan and his family is strongly following Nehruji's family and their principles.

On News
Tamil Nadu Congress Committee has formed alliance with DMK (Dravida Munnetra Kazhagam) to face 2016 Tamil Nadu Assembly Elections. Congress has been allocated 41 assembly constituencies to contest including Gobichettipalayam Assembly. S. V. Saravanan has been nominated to contest.

Tamil Nadu 2016 State Assembly Elections on news.

The news   about the S. V. Saravanan candidate announcement on The Hindu Tamil Daily newspaper.

References

External links

 Gobichettipalayam (State Assembly Constituency)
 

Living people
1964 births
People from Erode district
People from Gobichettipalayam
Indian National Congress politicians from Tamil Nadu
United Progressive Alliance candidates in the 2014 Indian general election